Mogobane

References 

South-East District (Botswana)
Villages in Botswana